Chris Ackie (born January 26, 1992) is a professional Canadian football linebacker for the Montreal Alouettes of the Canadian Football League (CFL). He played CIS football for the Wilfrid Laurier Golden Hawks from 2011 to 2014. He was drafted fourth overall by the Montreal Alouettes in the 2015 CFL Draft.

Professional career

New York Giants
Ackie tried out for the New York Giants at their rookie mini camp invite in 2015 but didn't catch on with them.

Montreal Alouettes
He was originally drafted 4th overall by the Montreal Alouettes in the 2015 CFL Draft and signed with the team to a three-year contract on June 1, 2015. During his first two seasons with the Alouettes, Ackie played both outside linebacker positions and special teams. He was signed to one-year contract extension on January 15, 2018. Ackie played in 48 games for the Alouettes over four seasons, contributing 86 defensive tackles, 22 special teams tackles, four forced fumbles, one interception and one quarterback sack.

Ottawa Redblacks
On October 10, 2018, Ackie was traded just prior to the trade deadline to the Ottawa Redblacks in exchange for a second-round pick in the 2019 CFL Draft. Ackie's contract expired on November 28, 2018 and he became a free agent.

Montreal Alouettes (II)
Ackie remained unsigned at the beginning of the 2019 CFL season and was reportedly waiting until injuries created a demand for his signing. After losing linebackers Boseko Lokombo and Glenn Love to injury, the Alouettes re-signed Ackie on July 8, 2019 to a one-year deal.

Toronto Argonauts
Upon entering free agency, Ackie signed with the Toronto Argonauts on February 12, 2020. However, the 2020 CFL season was cancelled and his contract expired on February 8, 2021.

Montreal Alouettes (III)
On February 9, 2021, it was announced that Ackie had signed with the Montreal Alouettes, his third tenure with the club. In his first season back in Montreal Ackie played in all 14 regular season games contributing with 48 defensive tackles, and two interceptions. He missed five games early in the 2022 season with an injured ankle, he was activated off the injured reserve list on August 1, 2022.

Personal life
Ackie's cousin, Jordan Ackie is pursuing a lacrosse scholarship. Chris Ackie is a native of Cambridge, Ontario.

References

External links
 Montreal Alouettes bio

1992 births
Living people
Canadian football linebackers
Wilfrid Laurier Golden Hawks football players
Montreal Alouettes players
Ottawa Redblacks players
Toronto Argonauts players
Players of Canadian football from Ontario
Sportspeople from Cambridge, Ontario